Muharrem Demirok (born 3 October 1976) is a Swedish politician who has been the leader of the Centre Party since 2 February 2023. Additionally, Demirok has been a member of Riksdag since September 2022.

Early life 
Demirok was born on 3 October 1976 in Huddinge, Stockholm County, Sweden to a Swedish mother and Turkish father.

Career 
He is a member of the Centre Party. From 2009 to 2022, he served as a municipal council in the municipality of Linköping. Following the 2022 Swedish general election, he became a member of Riksdag. On 11 January 2023, during the 2023 Centre Party leadership election, he was endorsed by the party's election committee as the candidate to succeed Annie Lööf, the incumbent leader of Centre Party. He was appointed party leader on 2 February, during a party meeting in Helsingborg.

Personal life 
Demirok has been convicted for two counts of assault, for which he received fines and did community service. The first assault took place in 1995 with another student during his high school studies. The second assault happened in 1999, when he ended up in an altercation with another student at a university party in Linköping.  He is in a cohabitating partnership and has three children.

References 

1976 births
Living people
Centre Party (Sweden) politicians
Leaders of political parties in Sweden
Members of the Riksdag 2022–2026
Politicians from Stockholm
21st-century Swedish politicians